President Border Guard Padak (Bravery) Bengali: {প্রেসিডেন্ট বর্ডার গার্ড পদক (সাহসিকতা)}, is a border guard medal of Bangladesh. The medal is intended for the awarding the officers of Border Guard Bangladesh.

References 

Military awards and decorations of Bangladesh